The Marshall Islands are the site of a number of seamounts. These volcanoes form several groups, including the Ralik Chain, the Ratak Chain and some seamounts around Anewetak. These seamounts are in turn part of a larger province that extends from the South Pacific to the Mariana Trench and is characterized by unusually shallow ocean ground.

These seamounts and volcanoes do not have simple hotspot-like age progressions, with some volcanoes being younger than one would expect from age progression and having more than one active episode. In some places, a middle Cretaceous and a late Cretaceous episode of volcanic activity have been determined by radiometric dating. Despite this, some hotspot-based genesis models have been formulated, often implying that French Polynesian hotspots are responsible for the formation of seamounts, with the Society hotspot, Rurutu hotspot, Rarotonga hotspot and the Macdonald hotspot being candidate hotspots responsible for the development of the Marshall Islands seamounts. Such linkages are in part supported by geochemical data. Some discrepancies between the age and position of such seamounts and the predictions of the hotspot model may reflect the activity of short-lived hotspots linked to large mantle plumes that produce more than one hotspot.

See also 

 MIT Guyot
 Ioah Guyot

References

Sources 

 
 
 
 
 
 
 
 

Geology of the Pacific Ocean
Landforms of the Marshall Islands
Seamounts of the Pacific Ocean